First Place is an album by the J. J. Johnson Quartet which was released on the Columbia label.

Reception

Allmusic awarded the album 4 stars stating "Bop is their thing, and Johnson's flawless lines on his trombone were never more in evidence than on this stupendous effort...  Johnson's smaller ensemble dates have stood the test of time as perhaps his best ever -- which is debatable, considering all his fine work, but First Place is indisputably brilliant".

Track listing

Recorded at Columbia Studios, Studio A, NYC on April 11, 1957 (tracks 2, 3, 5, 6 & 9), April 12, 1957 (tracks 1, 4 & 7) and at Columbia 30th Street Studios, NYC on April 26, 1957 (track 8).

Personnel
J. J. Johnson – trombone
Tommy Flanagan – piano
Paul Chambers – bass
Max Roach – drums

References

Columbia Records albums
J. J. Johnson albums
1957 albums
Albums produced by Cal Lampley